Mohamed Charaoui (born 1906, date of death unknown) was an Egyptian fencer. He competed in the team épée and individual sabre events at the 1928 Summer Olympics.

References

External links
 

1906 births
Year of death missing
Egyptian male épée fencers
Olympic fencers of Egypt
Fencers at the 1928 Summer Olympics
Egyptian male sabre fencers